is a Japanese short track speed skater. She competed at the 1994 Winter Olympics and the 1998 Winter Olympics.

References

1969 births
Living people
Japanese female short track speed skaters
Olympic short track speed skaters of Japan
Short track speed skaters at the 1994 Winter Olympics
Short track speed skaters at the 1998 Winter Olympics
Sportspeople from Hokkaido
20th-century Japanese women